Eugène Louis Gabriel Isabey (22 July 1803, in Paris – 25 April 1886, in Montévrain) was a French painter, lithographer and watercolorist in the Romantic style.

Biography 
He was born to Jean-Baptiste Isabey, a well known painter who enjoyed the patronage of the Imperial Family. Originally, he wanted to be a sailor, but his father insisted that he study painting; a turnabout from the usual situation where the family opposes an artistic career in favor of something more practical.

After studying with his father and copying the Old Masters at the Louvre, he began sharing a studio with the landscape painter Xavier Leprince at Honfleur in 1824, then moved to Saint-Siméon after Leprince's untimely death. The following year, he sent some landscapes to the Salon for his first formal exhibition.

In 1831, he was chosen to accompany a diplomatic mission to Morocco, led by the Comte de Mornay, but he politely refused. He had just returned from a short trip to Algiers, where he had painted scenes of the Royal Navy's campaign, and was concerned that the situation there was still too unsettled to make a lengthy stay. He was replaced by his friend, Eugène Delacroix, who created over 100 works that are now considered classics of Orientalism.

Shortly after, however, Isabey became a court painter for King Louis-Philippe and was named a Knight in the Légion d'Honneur in 1832. One of his best known paintings was done during this period, in 1840, depicting the return of Napoleon's remains from Saint Helena aboard the Belle Poule.

He favored historical paintings, genre scenes and landscapes, but also executed numerous canvases depicting storms and shipwrecks, possibly reflecting his own thwarted career plans. During a trip to England, he was known to have studied the works of J.M.W. Turner. He was especially skillful at rendering subtleties in darker colors; which might be called a form of grisaille. He took in students on a regular basis; including Eugène Boudin, Johan Barthold Jongkind and Durand-Brager. In his later years, he turned from marine painting to historical scenes, usually of a violent nature, such as massacres, duels and robberies.

A primary school in Montévrain has been named in his honor.

Selected paintings

References

Further reading 
 Pierre Miquel, Eugène Isabey : 1803-1886 : la marine au XIXe siècle, (Volumes 9-10 of " Le Paysage français au XIXe siècle" Éd. de la Martinelle, Maurs-la-Jolie, 1980
 Eugène Isabey (1803-1886). Par les ruelles et par les grèves, exhibition catalog, 5 July-17 September 2012, Louvre, curator: Christophe Leribault

External links 

 Arcadja Auctions: More works by Isabey.
 Biographical notes @ The Famous Artists
 Isabey exhibition (2012) @ the Louvre website.

1803 births
1886 deaths
19th-century French painters
Painters from Paris
French draughtsmen
French illustrators
French male painters
French marine artists
Burials at Père Lachaise Cemetery
Recipients of the Legion of Honour
19th-century French male artists